Dental bodies corporate are corporations entitled to practice dentistry in the UK. They are a unique class of corporations. Originally they were limited in number by the Dentists Act 1984, but their status has changed following the 2005 Amendment to the Act. An Order to amend the Dentists Act (1984) was made in July 2005 which removed key restrictions on Dental Bodies Corporate (DBCs). Prior to these changes 28 DBCs existed and they formed the General Dental Council’s list of DBCs.  This list is now defunct.

Any corporate body can now carry out the business of dentistry provided that it can satisfy the conditions of board membership set out in the amended Dentists Act. One intended objective of the amendment was to require a majority of the directors of a DBC to be registered dentists or registered Dental Care Professionals (DCPs), or a combination of dentists and DCPs.

Dental organisations based in the United Kingdom